was a village located in Gunma, Japan during the years 1889–1954.

History
Toyoaki Village was formed in 1889 as a result of the merging of three villages: Ishihara Village, Naka Village, and Yunoue (Miyuukida) Village. On April 1, 1954, Toyoaki Village merged with Furumaki Village, Kanashima Village and Shibukawa Town to become Shibukawa City.

Today
The area formerly held as Toyoaki Village is now a part of Shibukawa City, and the name of the former village is retained in the name of an elementary school.

Dissolved municipalities of Gunma Prefecture
Shibukawa, Gunma